Augusta Presbyterian Church is a historic Presbyterian church building at Third and Walnut Streets in Augusta, Arkansas. It is a large brick building with a gable roof and Gothic Revival styling. Built in 1871 for a congregation organized ten years earlier, it is Augusta's oldest church.

The church building was listed on the National Register of Historic Places in 1986.

See also
National Register of Historic Places listings in Woodruff County, Arkansas

References

Presbyterian churches in Arkansas
Churches on the National Register of Historic Places in Arkansas
Churches completed in 1871
National Register of Historic Places in Woodruff County, Arkansas
Gothic Revival church buildings in Arkansas
1871 establishments in Arkansas
Augusta, Arkansas